Club Universidad Nacional A.C. Premier was a professional football team that played in the Mexican Football League. They were playing in the Liga Premier (Mexico's Third Division). Club Universidad Nacional A.C. Premier was affiliated with Club Universidad Nacional who plays in the Liga MX. The games was held in the Mexico City neighborhood of Coyoacán in the Estadio La Cantera. In June 2020, this team was discontinued due to the creation of Pumas Tabasco, a team that plays in the Liga de Expansión MX and which was made up of UNAM Premier players.

Players

Current squad

References

External links

Football clubs in Mexico City
Mexican reserve football clubs
Liga Premier de México